Donna Yoh (June 22, 1959 – August 9, 2011) was an American politician who served one term in the Kansas House of Representatives as the representative from the 2nd district. A Republican, she was elected to the Kansas Legislature in 1994 and served until her defeat by Democrat Robert Grant in the 1996 election.

Yoh was a graduate of Parsons High School in Parsons, Kansas, and received a PhD from the University of Virginia. She served in the U.S. Army and worked as a life coach.

References

1959 births
2011 deaths
Life coaches
Republican Party members of the Kansas House of Representatives
20th-century American politicians
20th-century American women politicians
Women state legislators in Kansas
University of Virginia alumni
People from Parsons, Kansas
21st-century American women politicians
Female United States Army personnel
21st-century American politicians